February 28 (February 29) - Eastern Orthodox liturgical calendar - March 2

All fixed commemorations below are observed on March 14 by Orthodox Churches on the Old Calendar.

For March 1st, Orthodox Churches on the Old Calendar commemorate the Saints listed on February 16 (February 17 on leap years).

Saints

 Righteous martyr Eudokia of Heliopolis (107)
 Martyrs Nestorianus (Nestor), Tribimius, Marcellus, and Anthony, of Perge in Pamphylia, by the sword (249-251) 
 Martyr Antonina of Nicaea in Bithynia (c. 286-305)  (see also: June 12)
 Virgin-martyr Domnina of Syria (c. 460)
 Martyrs Antonius, Marcellus, Silvester and Sophronius, in Palestine.
 Martyrs Agapius, Nicephorus and Charisius.
 Saint Silvester.
 Saint Synesius, ascetic of Lysos, Cyprus.

Pre-Schism Western saints

 260 Martyrs of Rome (c. 269)
 Martyrs Hermes, Adrian and Companions, in Numidia in North Africa under Maximian Herculeus (c. 290)
 Martyr Luperculus (3rd century)
 Martyrs Leo, Donatus, Abundantius, Nicephorus, and nine others - a group of thirteen martyrs who laid down their lives for Christ in North Africa.
 Saint Felix III, Pope of Rome from 483-492 (492)
 Saint Herculanus of Perugia, Bishop of Perugia in Italy, beheaded by soldiers of Totila of the Ostrogoths (549) (see also: November 7)
 Saint Albinus of Angers (Aubin) (c. 550)
 Saint David of Wales, patron saint of Wales (c. 589)
 Saint Marnock (Marnanus, Marnan, Marnoc) (c. 625)
 Saint Suitbert (Swithbert), "Apostle of the Frisians", monastic founder in the Netherlands (713)
 Saint Siviard, monk at Saint-Calais on the River Anisole in France, who succeeded his father as abbot of the monastery (729)
 Saint Monan (874)
 Venerable Luke of Sicily (Leo Luke of Corleone, Leoluca), Abbot of the Monastery of Mount Mula in Calabria and Wonderworker (c. 915).
 Martyrs Gervasius and Leo (Léon I or Leo of Rouen, "Apostle of the Basques" and Bishop of Bayonne), brothers (c. 900).
 Saint Rudesind, a Galician bishop and abbot (977)

Post-Schism Orthodox saints

 Venerable Agapius of the Vatopedi Monastery on Mount Athos (13th century).
 Venerable Martyrius, Abbot of Zelenetsk in Pskov (1603)
 New martyr Parascevas of Trebizond (1659)

New martyrs and confessors

 New hieromartyr Methodius, of Russia (1920)
 New martyr Antonina of Kizliar, Abbess (1924)
 New martyr Anastasia Andreyevna, Fool-for-Christ, in the North Caucasus.
 Venerable Mother Zosima of Ennatsky (1935)
 New Hieromartyr Olga (1937)
 New Hieromartyr Peter Lyubimov, Archpriest, of Kishkino, Moscow (1938)
 New Hieromartyrs (1938):
 Basil Nikitsky, John Streltsov, Benjamin Famintsev, and Michael Bukrinsky, priests; 
 New Hieromartyr Anthony Korzh, Hierodeacon of Kiziltash Monastery, Crimea; 
 Virgin-martyrs Anna, Daria Zaitseva, Eudokia Arkhipov, Alexandra Dyachkova;  
 Martyr Basil Arkhipov;  
 Virgin-martyr Hope (Nadezhda) Abakumova. 
 New Hieromartyr Alexander Ilyenkov of Berdyansk (Simferopol-Crimea), priest (1942)
 New Hieromartyr Basil Konstantinov-Grishin, priest (1943)

Other commemorations

 Repose of Barsanuphius (Hrynevich), Archbishop of Tver (1958)

Icon gallery

Notes

References

Sources 
 March 1 / 14. Orthodox Calendar (PRAVOSLAVIE.RU).
 March 14 / March 1. HOLY TRINITY RUSSIAN ORTHODOX CHURCH (A parish of the Patriarchate of Moscow).
 March 1. OCA - The Lives of the Saints.
 March 1. Latin Saints of the Orthodox Patriarchate of Rome.
 The Roman Martyrology. Transl. by the Archbishop of Baltimore. Last Edition, According to the Copy Printed at Rome in 1914. Revised Edition, with the Imprimatur of His Eminence Cardinal Gibbons. Baltimore: John Murphy Company, 1916. pp. 62–63.
 Rev. Richard Stanton. A Menology of England and Wales, or, Brief Memorials of the Ancient British and English Saints Arranged According to the Calendar, Together with the Martyrs of the 16th and 17th Centuries. London: Burns & Oates, 1892. pp. 92–95.

Greek Sources
 Great Synaxaristes:  1 ΜΑΡΤΙΟΥ. ΜΕΓΑΣ ΣΥΝΑΞΑΡΙΣΤΗΣ.
  Συναξαριστής. 1 Μαρτίου. ECCLESIA.GR. (H ΕΚΚΛΗΣΙΑ ΤΗΣ ΕΛΛΑΔΟΣ).

Russian Sources
  14 марта (1 марта). Православная Энциклопедия под редакцией Патриарха Московского и всея Руси Кирилла (электронная версия). (Orthodox Encyclopedia - Pravenc.ru).
  1 марта (ст.ст.) 14 марта 2013 (нов. ст.). Русская Православная Церковь Отдел внешних церковных связей. (DECR).

March 01